Malibu may refer to:

Places
 Malibu, California, a United States city
Malibu High School
Malibu Lake
Malibu Creek
 Malibu, British Columbia, a locality in Canada
 Baja Malibu, a beach in Rosarito Beach Municipality, Baja California, Mexico

Arts, entertainment, and media

Music
 Malibu (album), 2016, by Anderson Paak
 "Malibu" (Hole song), 1998
 "Malibu" (Miley Cyrus song), 2017
 "Malibu" (Kim Petras song), 2020
 "Malibu", a jazz standard written by Benny Carter, included in Benny Carter Songbook Volume II
 "Malibu", a 1978 song by Patricia Paay
 "Malibu", a 1964 song by The Tymes
 "Malibu", a song by Trixie Mattel from the album Barbara, 2020
 Malibu Nights, a 2018 album by LANY
 "Malibú", a 1999 song by Jagúar
 "Malibu", a song by Migos and Polo G from Culture III, 2021
 Malibu (album), 2021, by Aftertaste

Other arts, entertainment, and media
 Malibu (film), a 1983 television miniseries
 Malibu, a character played by Sharon Tate in the film Don't Make Waves
 Malibu, CA (TV series), an American sitcom that aired between 1998 and 2000
 Malibu Comics, a comic book publisher
 Malibu Barbie, a variant of Barbie doll launched in 1971
 Malibu Stacy, a fictional plastic doll in the television series The Simpsons
 Lisa vs. Malibu Stacy, the episode of the television series The Simpsons

Transportation and sports
 Malibu, a type of surfboard
 Chevrolet Malibu, an automobile
 Malibu Boats, a boat manufacturer
 Moyes Malibu, an Australian hang glider design
 Piper PA-46, a single engine aircraft
 M/V Malibu, a yacht

Other uses
 Roger Joseph Manning Jr. (born 1966), American electronic music artist known as Malibu
 Malibu (rum), a coconut-flavored liqueur
 Malibu languages, a group of extinct languages once spoken in Colombia
 Malibu Moon (1997–2021), an American thoroughbred horse

See also
 2000 Malibu Road, a 1992 American sitcom
 Malibu Country, an 2012 American sitcom